The village of Sachrang is an Ortsteil (quarter) of the municipality Aschau im Chiemgau, in Bavaria, Germany.

History

Notable people
Werner Herzog, film director, raised in Sachrang

References

External links 
 Official website

Villages in Bavaria